George Brown (6 October 1887 – 3 December 1964) was an English cricketer who played in seven Test matches between 1921 and 1923. George Brown was born in Cowley, Oxfordshire, the son of Edwin Brown and Sarah Ann (née Casey). As his figures indicate, he was a very versatile cricketer, being useful as batsman, bowler and wicketkeeper. He played first-class cricket for Hampshire between 1908 and 1933. Though he was never their regular keeper, it was in that role that he played for England, with stiffening the batting in mind.

Brown was included in a 2005 list of Hampshire cult figures.

References

External links
 

1887 births
1964 deaths
England Test cricketers
English cricketers
Hampshire cricketers
Players cricketers
Marylebone Cricket Club cricketers
North v South cricketers
English cricketers of 1919 to 1945
L. H. Tennyson's XI cricket team
Wicket-keepers